Motu or MOTU may refer to:

Places
Motu (geography), a reef islet formed by broken coral and sand surrounding an atoll
Motu Nao, Marquesas Islands
Motu Nui, near Easter Island
Motu Oa, Marquesas Islands
Motu One (Society Islands), south Pacific Ocean
Motu Paahi, French Polynesia
Motu (tribal area), Niue
Motu River, New Zealand
Motu, New Zealand, a settlement near Matawai

Given name
Motu Hafoka (born 1987), Samoan footballer
Motu Matu'u (born 1987), New Zealand rugby union player
Motu Tony (born 1981), Samoan-born New Zealand rugby league player

Fictional characters
 Motu, from the comic/TV show Motu Patlu

Other uses
Motu people
Motu language, a language of Papua New Guinea
Motu proprio, a type of Papal document
Mark of the Unicorn (MOTU), a maker of professional audio hardware and software 
Masters of the Universe, an action figure line of the 1980s, commonly abbreviated as MotU or MOTU
Motu Economic and Public Policy Research a research institute from New Zealand

See also

De Motu (disambiguation)
Motu Iti (disambiguation)
Motu One (disambiguation)
Motuloa (disambiguation)
Motus (disambiguation)

Language and nationality disambiguation pages